Chen Weiming (born 24 September 1997) is a Chinese footballer who plays for Chinese Super League side Guangzhou R&F.

Club career
Chen Weiming was promoted to Chinese Super League side Guangzhou R&F first team squad by manager Dragan Stojković in the summer of 2016. He made his senior debut on 31 March 2018 in a 2–1 away win over Changchun Yatai, coming on as a substitute for Chang Feiya in the 88th minute.

Career statistics
.

References

External links
 

1997 births
Chinese footballers
Footballers from Guangzhou
Guangzhou City F.C. players
Chinese Super League players
Living people
Association football defenders